Manuel Maria Soares Pêra (16 November 1894 – 11 August 1967) was a Portuguese actor based in Brazil.

Biography
Manuel was born in Carregosa, Oliveira de Azeméis, Aveiro District, Portugal. He was the father of Brazilian actresses Marília Pêra and Sandra Pêra, fruits of his marriage to the actress Dinorah Marzullo. He was brother of the Portuguese actor Abel Pêra (1891-1975) and Joaquim.

Filmography

Cinema

References

External links
 

1894 births
1967 deaths
People from Oliveira de Azeméis
Portuguese male film actors
Portuguese emigrants to Brazil